Chastinsky District is an administrative district (raion) of Perm Krai, Russia; one of the thirty-three in the krai. Municipally, it is incorporated as Chastinsky Municipal District. It is located in the southwest of the krai. Its administrative center is the rural locality (a selo) of Chastye. Population:  The population of Chastye accounts for 37.9% of the district's total population.

Geography and climate
About 34% of the district's area is forested; the forests are mostly coniferous. Natural resources include oil and peat. Climate is temperate continental.

History
The district was established on January 13, 1924, although its borders kept changing until December 30, 1968. In 1931–1935, the district was merged into Osinsky District.

Demographics
As of the 2002 Census, Russians, at 96.4%, are the dominant ethnicity in the district.

Economy
The economy of the district is mainly agricultural.

References

Notes

Sources

Districts of Perm Krai
States and territories established in 1924
States and territories disestablished in 1931
States and territories established in 1935